The Çivril branch was a branch of the Turkish State Railways. Due to low ridership and virtually no freight traffic, the line was abandoned in 1988. The route is across the relatively flat Çivril plain and passes by Lake Işıklı.

References

Turkish State Railways
Çivril District
Railway lines opened in 1889
Railway lines closed in 1988
Railway lines in Turkey
Closed railway lines in Turkey